Sunrayce 97 was an intercollegiate solar car race on June 19–28, 1997. The event was won by Cal State LA, with the Massachusetts Institute of Technology finishing less than 20 minutes behind them. It was the 4th American national championship solar car race held.

Route
Day 1: Thu, June 19: Start in Indianapolis, Indiana; finish in Terre Haute, IN.
Day 2: Fri, June 20: Start in Terre Haute, IN, must reach Effingham, Illinois checkpoint, finish in Godfrey, IL.
Day 3: Sat, June 21: Start in Godfrey, IL, must reach Louisiana, Missouri checkpoint, finish in Fulton, MO.
Day 4: Sun, June 22: Start in Fulton, MO, must reach California, MO checkpoint, finish in Lee's Summit, MO.
Rest Day: Mon, June 23: Lee's Summit, MO.
Day 5: Tue, June 24: Start in Lee's Summit, MO, must reach Topeka, Kansas checkpoint, finish in Manhattan, KS.
Day 6: Wed, June 25: Start in Manhattan, KS, must reach Glasco, KS checkpoint, finish in Smith Center, KS.
Day 7: Thu, June 26: Start in Smith Center, KS, must reach Oberlin, KS checkpoint, finish in St. Francis, KS.
Day 8: Fri, June 27: Tue, June 27: Start in St. Francis, KS, must reach Anton, Colorado checkpoint, finish in Limon, CO.
Day 9: Sat, June 28: Start in Limon, CO, finish in Colorado Springs, CO.

Results

 Not qualifying but ran the first leg of the race in their own was Middle Tennessee State University.

References

1997 in American motorsport
Solar car races